Parliamentary Secretary to the Ministry of Transport was a junior position at the British Ministry of Transport. The office was renamed Parliamentary Secretary to the Ministry of War Transport in 1941, but resumed its former name at the end of the Second World War.

Parliamentary Secretaries to the Ministry of Transport, 1924–41
John Moore-Brabazon 11 November 1924 – 14 January 1927
vacant 14 January 1927 – 4 June 1929
John Russell, 2nd Earl Russell 11 June 1929 – 1 December 1929
Arthur Ponsonby 1 December 1929 – 1 March 1931
John Allen Parkinson 1 March 1931 – 24 August 1931
George Gillett 4 September 1931 – 25 November 1931
Ivor Miles Windsor-Clive, 2nd Earl of Plymouth 25 November 1931 – 29 September 1932
Cuthbert Headlam 29 September 1932 – 5 July 1934
vacant 5 July 1934 – 18 June 1935
Austin Hudson 18 June 1935 – 14 July 1939
Robert Bernays 14 July 1939 – 18 May 1940
Frederick Montague 18 May 1940 – 1 May 1941

Parliamentary Secretary to the Ministry of War Transport, 1941–45
John Jestyn Llewellin 1 May 1941 – 4 February 1942
Sir Arthur Salter 29 June 1941 – 4 February 1942 
Philip Noel-Baker, 4 February 1942 – 26 May 1945
Peter Thorneycroft, 26 May 1945 – 26 July 1945

Parliamentary Secretaries to the Ministry of Transport, 1945–70
George Strauss 4 August 1945 – 7 October 1947
James Callaghan 7 October 1947 – 2 March 1950
George William Lucas, 1st Baron Lucas of Chilworth 2 March 1950 – 26 October 1951
Joseph Gurney Braithwaite 5 November 1951 – 1 November 1953
Reginald Maudling 18 April 1952 – 24 November 1952
John Profumo 24 November 1952 – 9 January 1957
Hugh Molson 11 November 1953 – 9 January 1957
Richard Nugent 18 January 1957 – 22 October 1959
Airey Neave 18 January 1957 – 16 January 1959
John Hay 16 January 1959 – 3 May 1963
John Charles Compton Cavendish, 5th Baron Chesham 22 October 1959 – 16 October 1964
John Hughes-Hallett 26 April 1961 – 16 October 1964
Tam Galbraith 3 May 1963 – 16 October 1964
George Lindgren, Baron Lindgren 20 October 1964 – 10 January 1966
Stephen Swingler 20 October 1964 – 29 August 1967
John Morris 10 January 1966 – 6 April 1968
Neil George Carmichael 29 August 1967 – 13 October 1969
Robert Brown 6 April 1968 – 19 June 1970
Albert Murray 13 October 1969 – 19 June 1970
Michael Heseltine 24 June 1970 – 15 October 1970

Lists of government ministers of the United Kingdom
Defunct ministerial offices in the United Kingdom